FAM210B is a gene that which in Homo sapiens encodes the protein FAM210B. It has been conserved throughout evolutionary history, and is highly expressed in multiple tissues within the human body. FAM210B's primary location is the endoplasmic reticulum.

Gene

Locus 
FAM210B is found on the plus strand of chromosome 20, precisely at 20q13.2. This gene is 9,749 bases in length, corresponding to a 192 amino acid protein.

Aliases 
Alternative names include C20orf108, Hypothetical protein LOC116151, DJ116H4.1, and 5A3.

mRNA 
FAM210B has 2 known splice variants, formally known as FAM210B-001 an FAM210B-002. FAM210B-001 is 3 exons in length, whereas FAM210B-002 is 2 exons.

Protein 
The longest precursor protein is 192 amino acids in length. The molecular weight is 20.4 kdal, and isoelectric point is 10.8.

Structure

Primary Structure 
There is 1 positive charge run of 4 residues at position 79, EEKK. A high scoring transmembrane sequence is present at positions 99-123, VGVSLHIGISLISLGIFYM
VVSSGV. An endoplasmic reticulum retention signal (PAAK) is present at positions 187-191.

Secondary Structure 
The majority of the structure is composed of alpha helices. As predicted my Phyre 2, 61% of the protein forms alpha helices, and 28% forms transmembrane segments. A detailed map of the transmembrane topology is shown below.

Tertiary Structure 
I-Tasser predicted the folding of FAM210B to be as shown below.

Subcellular Location 
The primary location of the FAM210B protein is the endoplasmic reticulum. The amino acid sequence contains the endoplasmic retention signal PAAK near the C-terminus. There are 2 transmembrane domains, which have been determined and reaffirmed by multiple methods. They are highlighted in the post-translational modification image below.

Post-Translational Modifications 
The following conceptual translation presents expected post-translational modifications. The modifications were predicted by MotifScan, and then searched in greater detail in Expasy
Modifications found include propeptide cleavage sites, C-mannosylation sites, GalNAc O-glycosylation sites, lysine glycation sites, phosphorylation sites, a Coronavirus 3C-like proteinase cleavage site, and a GPI modification site.

Homology 
An important paralog for FAM210B is FAM210A. Orthologs and distant homologs have been found throughout mammalia, reptiles, birds, invertebrates, fish, amphibian, trichoplax, and fungi.

Paralogs

Orthologs

Evolutionary History 
The size of the gene family is two, and includes FAM210A and FAM210B. Gene duplication seems to have occurred when plants diverged from protists. The most distant ortholog found was Populus trichocarpa, also known as the black cottonwood tree. The unrooted phylogenetic tree below demonstrates this divergence. All of the organisms in the tree can also be found in the ortholog table above.

Expression 
FAM210B is ubiquitously expressed in Homo sapiens. It is expressed in each stage of development, and in many compromised health states including breast, cervical, liver, lung, ovarian, and pancreatic tumors.

Allen Brain Atlas 
These images were taken from Allen Brain Atlas and demonstrate expression of FAM210B in the mouse brain.
The images compare the expression of FAM210B (left) to dopamine beta hydroxylase (right) in a sagittal cut of the cerebellum.

GEO Profiles 
The following image contains the gene expression of FAM210B in patients with dengue fever or those who are convalescent. As seen by the blue dots, there is decreased rank of FAM210B in patients experiencing hemorrhagic fever and fever as compared to the healthy controls.

The following image contains the gene expression of FAM210B in patients with severe bacterial pneumonia, severe influenza, and those who received the influenza vaccine. As seen in the image, FAM210B is lower in rank in the patients with severe bacterial pneumonia and are even lower in those with severe influenza, as compared to those who received the influenza vaccine.

Interacting Proteins 
The following proteins were determined to interact with FAM210B. Their interaction was determined by affinity capture and mass spectrometric methods. By analyzing the function of these proteins, more insight can be given into the function of FAM210B.

References 

Genes